Augustus Cincinnatus Hand (September 4, 1803 in Shoreham, Addison County, Vermont – March 8, 1878 in Elizabethtown, New York, Essex County, New York) was an American lawyer, jurist, and politician from New York. He served one term in the U.S. House of Representatives from 1839 to 1841, and was also a justice on the New York Supreme Court from 1847 to 1855.

Both his son, Samuel and grandson, Learned Hand, became prominent judges in their own right.

Life
He studied law in at Litchfield Law School. He was admitted to the bar in 1828, and commenced practice at Crown Point, New York. He removed to Elizabethtown in 1831, and was Surrogate of Essex County from 1831 to 1839.

Congress 
Hand was elected as a Democrat to the 26th United States Congress, and served from March 4, 1839, to March 3, 1841.

State legislature 
He was a member of the New York State Senate from 1845 to 1847, sitting in the 68th, 69th and 70th New York State Legislatures.

New York Supreme Court 
He was a justice of the New York Supreme Court (4th District) from 1847 to 1855, and ex officio a judge of the New York Court of Appeals in 1855. Afterwards he resumed the practice of law.

Later career and death 
He was a delegate to the 1868 Democratic National Convention. He resumed the practice of his profession.

He was buried in the family cemetery in Elizabethtown, NY.

Family legacy 
His son Samuel Hand (1834-1886) was an Associate Judge of the New York Court of Appeals and his grandson Learned Hand (1872-1961) was a Senior Judge in the United States Court of Appeals for the Second Circuit. State Senator Matthew Hale (1829–1897) was married to his daughter Ellen S. Hand (c.1835–1867).

References

The New York Civil List compiled by Franklin Benjamin Hough (pages 135f, 141, 351 and 413; Weed, Parsons and Co., 1858)
 Court of Appeals judges

External links

Augustus Cincinnatus Hand entry at The Political Graveyard
 

1803 births
1878 deaths
Democratic Party New York (state) state senators
People from Shoreham, Vermont
Judges of the New York Court of Appeals
New York Supreme Court Justices
People from Elizabethtown, New York
Litchfield Law School alumni
Democratic Party members of the United States House of Representatives from New York (state)
19th-century American politicians
19th-century American judges